Kurush may refer to:

Currencies
kuruş, unit of currency in the Ottoman Empire and Turkey

People
Kurush Bharucha-Reid (1955 – 2010), officer in the United States Army
Kurush Deboo (born 1963), Indian actor

Places
Kurush, Dokuzparinsky District, Republic of Dagestan, village in Dokuzparinsky District, Dagestan, Russia
Kurush, Khasavyurtovsky District, Republic of Dagestan, village in Khasavyurtovsky District, Dagestan, Russia
Kurush, Tajikistan, village in Sughd Region